Ofotens og Vesteraalens Dampskibsselskab or OVDS was a Norwegian shipping company that operated ferries in Northern Norway, including the Coastal Express, car ferries and passenger ferries. The company merged with Troms Fylkes Dampskibsselskap in 2006 to form Hurtigruten Group.

OVDS's main office was in Narvik while the ferry section was located in Stokmarknes. The company had about 1,500 employees at the time of the merger and operated 14 coastal expresses, 18 car ferries and 14 passenger ferries. OVDS was created as a merger between the two shipping companies Vesteraalens Dampskibsselskab (VDS, established in 1881) and Ofoten Dampskipsselskap (ODS, established in 1912).

References 

Ferry companies of Norway
Defunct shipping companies of Norway
Transport companies of Nordland
Companies disestablished in 2006
Companies with year of establishment missing